William Knollys, 1st Earl of Banbury, KG, PC (1544 – 25 May 1632) was an English nobleman at the court of Queen Elizabeth I and King James I.

Biography 
He was the son of Sir Francis Knollys, of Greys Court in Oxfordshire, and of Reading, in Berkshire, and his wife, Catherine Carey. Knollys was a Member of Parliament (MP) for Stafford in 1571, Tregony from 1572–81 and 1583–84 and for Oxfordshire from 1584–1586, 1592–1593 and 1601. In 1584 he was made castellan of Wallingford Castle. In 1596 he was appointed Lord Lieutenant of Berkshire, a position he held until his death. In 1586 he served as a captain in the Netherlands under his brother-in-law Robert Dudley, Earl of Leicester, who knighted him.

William inherited both Greys Court and the rebuilt Caversham Park mansion on the death of his father in 1596. He often resided at Caversham, entertaining both Queen Elizabeth I and Queen Anne of Denmark there. He was first married to Dorothy Bray, daughter of Edmund Braye, 1st Baron Braye by his wife Jane Halliwell and widow of Edmund Brydges, 2nd Baron Chandos of Sudeley (d 1573). Dorothy was 20 years his senior, and had at least five children from her first marriage, though their marriage proved childless.

In the mid-1590s, William took in Mary Fitton, the daughter of a family friend. Intended to be her protector from wayward influence of courtiers, he fell in love with her himself and wished his wife dead so he could marry her. He expressed desire for children with her, and when made godfather to Mary sister's daughter (Anne Newdigate) he named that child Mary. His infatuation with his ward was the cause of much court laughter:

Party Beard, party beard...
...the white hind was crossed:
Brave Pembroke struck her down
And took her from the clown 

went one song about him. He was derided as "Party Beard" because his beard was three colours: white at the roots, yellow mid-way and black at the ends. Mary refused him. He courted her even after she had an illegitimate child (who died) with the earl of Pembroke but Mary was not interested and after his wife Dorothy died (31 October 1605 at Minty, buried at Rotherfield Greys) he remarried quickly.

In 1603 he was created Baron Knollys. On 23 December 1605, Knollys married Lady Elizabeth Howard (1586–1658), the daughter of Thomas Howard, 1st Earl of Suffolk. In 1616 he was created Viscount Wallingford and in 1626 he was further honoured as Earl of Banbury.

Elizabeth remarried shortly after Knollys' death to Edward Vaux, 4th Baron Vaux of Harrowden. There is some debate as to whether Elizabeth's two sons, Edward (1627–1645) and Nicholas (1631–1674) (titular 2nd and 3rd Earls respectively), were William's offspring, as her first son was born when William was 80 years old and after more than 20 years of marriage. As a result, the House of Lords refused to seat them as Earls of Banbury and considered them to be illegitimate sons of Elizabeth and Edward Vaux.

Knollys is also believed to be the inspiration behind the character of Malvolio in Shakespeare's 'Twelfth Night'.

Ancestry

Footnotes

References
This article contains text from A General and Heraldic Dictionary of the Peerages of England, Ireland, and Scotland: Extinct, Dormant, and in Abeyance, Vol. VIII, by John Burke,

Haynes, Alan. Sex in Elizabethan England''. Gloucestershire: Sutton Publishing Limited, 1997. 

|-

|-

|-

Earls in the Peerage of England
William Banbury
1544 births
1632 deaths
Knights of the Garter
Lord-Lieutenants of Berkshire
Lord-Lieutenants of Oxfordshire
Knollys, William
Knollys, William
People from Caversham, Reading
People from Reading, Berkshire
People from Rotherfield Greys
Treasurers of the Household
Knollys, William
Knollys, William
Knollys, William
Knollys, William
Knollys, William
16th-century English nobility